Beaverton Creek is a light rail station on the MAX Blue Line in Beaverton, Oregon, United States. It is the 9th stop westbound on the Westside MAX.

The station is located near parkland, which is near the Nike World Campus. Retained at the station's crosswalk to the platform are remnants of a railroad spur, once used to serve light industrial customers and to deliver MAX vehicles. Nike operates its own fleet of shuttle buses, all running on biodiesel, to its world headquarters and nearby satellite offices.

In March 2011, TriMet received a federal grant to pay for the installation of security cameras at the station.

References

External links
Station information (with eastbound ID number) from TriMet
Station information (with westbound ID number) from TriMet
MAX Light Rail Stations – more general TriMet page
Park & Ride Locations – TriMet page

MAX Light Rail stations
MAX Blue Line
1998 establishments in Oregon
Railway stations in the United States opened in 1998
Transportation in Beaverton, Oregon
Railway stations in Washington County, Oregon